Mizuta (written: 水田 lit. "water field") is a Japanese surname. Notable people with the surname include:

, Japanese baseball player
, Japanese poet and samurai
, Japanese jurist, educator and politician
, Japanese video game composer and musician
, Japanese academic and poet
, Japanese voice actress

Japanese-language surnames